Mochtherus tetraspilotus is a species of ground beetle in the family Carabidae. It is found in North America, temperate Asia, and the Pacific Ocean.

References

Further reading

 

Harpalinae
Articles created by Qbugbot
Beetles described in 1825